The 2014 FFA Cup preliminary rounds were a series of state-based knockout competitions, providing a qualification pathway for the 2014 FFA Cup, the Australian association football knockout cup competition.

The majority of clubs entered the tournament through their respective state federations, in which they competed in a state-based cup tournament to progress to the overall Round of 32 of the competition. A total of 22 teams will qualify from these qualifying competitions, joining the  10 A-League clubs in the Round of 32.

ACT
ACT clubs qualified for the FFA Cup via the 2013 Federation Cup.  From 2015 onwards the winner of that same years' Federation Cup would become the ACT's qualifier for the FFA Cup Round of 32.  Scheduling meant the 2014 winner would not be decided until after the qualifier needed to be named. To overcome this Capital Football announced that the 2014 winner of the ACTs pre-season competition was to be the ACT's qualifier in 2014.  However, Tuggeranong United – as the 2013 Federation Cup winners – successfully appealed to Capital Football to qualify them as ACT's 2014 FFA Cup entrant.

Schedule

First round
22 Clubs from various divisions of the ACT State Leagues, as well as 4 Masters teams, entered into the 2013 Federation Cup competition at this stage. Matches in this round were played on 6 April 2013.

Notes
 Byes – UC Pumas (3), Weston Creek (3), ANU FC (SL2) (4), Narrabundah (8), Gungahlin Juventus (5), and Gungahlin United Masters 2 (-).

Second round
Matches in this round were played on 13 April 2013.

Notes
 † = After Extra Time

Third round
8 Clubs from the ACT National Premier League (Tier 2) entered into the competition at this stage. Matches in this round were played on 2–23 May 2013.

Notes
 † = After Extra Time

Quarter-finals
All matches in this round were completed by 20 June–3 July 2013.

Semi-finals
Matches in this round were played on 25 July–1 August 2013.

Notes
 † = After Extra Time

Final
A total of 2 teams took part in this stage of the competition. The victorious team in this round qualified for the 2014 FFA Cup Round of 32. Matches in this round were played on 28 August 2013.

Notes
 † = After Extra Time

NSW
New South Wales clubs, other than Northern NSW and A-League clubs, qualify for the FFA Cup via the 2014 Waratah Cup.  There are seven allocated places from the Waratah Cup that qualify for the 2014 FFA Cup Round of 32; the four quarterfinal winners, and a separate competition for the four quarterfinal losers to determine the final three places.

The competition is for all teams of the National Premier Leagues NSW, NPL Division 2, State League Division 1, State League Division 2, as well as 55 Association teams which applied to participate in the 2014 competition.

Schedule

First round
A total of 64 teams took part in this stage of the competition, comprising 9 teams from the State League Division 2, and 55 teams from other amateur Associations that successfully applied. All matches in this round were completed by 16 March 2014.

Notes
 w/o = Walkover
 † = After Extra Time

Second round
A total of 32 teams took part in this stage of the competition. All matches in this round were completed by 23 March 2014.

Notes
 w/o = Walkover

Third round
A total of 40 teams took part in this stage of the competition. 12 Clubs from the NPL Division 2 and 12 clubs from the State League Division 1 entered into the competition at this stage. All matches in this round were completed by 9 April 2014.

Notes
 † = After Extra Time

Fourth round
A total of 32 teams took part in this stage of the competition. 12 Clubs from the National Premier Leagues NSW entered into the competition at this stage. All matches in this round were completed by 23 April 2014.

Notes
 † = After Extra Time

Fifth round
A total of 16 teams took part in this stage of the competition. All matches in this round were completed by 8 May 2014.

Notes
 † = After Extra Time

Quarter-finals
A total of 8 teams took part in this stage of the competition. The four victorious teams in this round qualified for the 2014 FFA Cup Round of 32, and to the semi-finals of the 2014 Waratah Cup. The losers progressed to the next round. Matches in this round were played on 21 May 2014.

Notes
 † = After Extra Time

Playoff round 1 
A total of 4 teams (the losers of the quarter-final fixtures) took part in this stage of the competition. The two victorious teams in this round qualified for the 2014 FFA Cup Round of 32, with the losers progressing to the next round. Matches in this round were played on 4–5 June 2014.

Playoff round 2 
A total of 2 teams (the losers of the first two playoff matches) took part in this stage of the competition. The victorious team in this round qualified for the 2014 FFA Cup Round of 32. The match in this round was played on 17 June 2014.

Northern NSW
Northern NSW clubs, other than Newcastle Jets in the A-League, qualified for the FFA Cup proper via a state-wide knockout competition called the NNSWF State Cup.  This competition was open to all men's NNSWF Premier Competition Clubs and Senior Zone Member Clubs.

Due to travel distances and time restraints, the competition was divided into two pools, the Northern Pool and the Southern Pool, to determine Final Series participants. The Northern Pool (NORTH) was composed of club teams from Football Mid North Coast, North Coast Football, Northern Inland Football and Football Far North Coast. The Southern Pool was split into two further sub-pools, the first (SOUTH) comprising National Premier League and New FM 1st Division club teams and the second (SOUTH-INTER) comprising inter-district club teams from Newcastle Football, Macquarie Football and Hunter Valley Football. Four teams from the Northern pool qualified for the final Series, two teams from the Southern pool (NPL+NEWFM), and two teams from the Southern inter-district pool (SOUTH-INTER).

A total of 78 Northern New South Wales teams took part in the State-wide Knockout Competition.

Schedule

First round
The first round for the Northern Pool took place on 15–16 February 2014. The first round for both the Southern pools was scheduled to be completed by 2 March 2014, although many games were washed out and had to be rescheduled.

Notes
 w/o = Walkover
 † = After Extra Time
 Byes : Kahibah (4) and Valentine (3).

Second round
The second round for all pools was scheduled to be completed by 16 March 2014.
However, several matches were delayed due to the wet weather issues from Round 1.

Notes
 w/o = Walkover
 † = After Extra Time
 Byes : Edgeworth Eagles (2) and Inverell Joeys (4).

Third round
Matches were scheduled for the Northern Pool on 26–27 April 2014, for the Southern (NPL+NEWFM) pool on 22–23 March 2014, for the Southern inter-district pool (SOUTH-INTER), all games were completed by 23 April 2014.

Although Inverell Joeys lost, they were then drawn as a 'lucky loser' for the final series, at the same time as the Round Four draw was undertaken for the Southern inter-district pool (SOUTH-INTER).

Notes
 † = After Extra Time
 Bye: Broadmeadow Magic (2).

Fourth round
Matches for the Southern (NPL+NEWFM) pool were scheduled for 7 May 2014, and matches for the Southern inter-district pool (SOUTH-INTER) on 21 May 2014.

Notes
 † = After Extra Time
 Byes: Kotara South (5) and South Cardiff (2).

Fifth round
The match for the Southern inter-district pool (SOUTH-INTER) was scheduled for 28 May 2014.

Notes
 Bye: New Lambton Eagles (4).

Quarter-finals
A total of 8 teams took part in this stage of the competition; four teams from the Northern Pool, two teams from the Southern Pool (NPL+NEWFM) and two teams from the inter-district Southern Pool (SOUTH-INTER). Matches in this round were played on 21 June 2014, at the neutral venue of Coffs Harbour International Stadium.

Semi-finals
A total of 4 teams took part in this stage of the competition. The two victorious teams in this round qualified for the 2014 FFA Cup Round of 32, and qualified for the final of the NNSWF State Cup. Matches in this round were played on 22 June 2014, at the neutral venue of Coffs Harbour International Stadium.

Queensland
Queensland clubs, other than Brisbane Roar in the A-League, qualified for the FFA Cup proper via the FQ Cup 2014 and the parallel linked Canale Travel Cup competition.  The FQ Cup was split into three regionalised zones; North Queensland (NTH), South East Queensland (SEQ) (excluding Brisbane), and Brisbane (BNE).

The North Queensland Zone comprised 4 sub zones; Far North Queensland (FNQ), North Queensland (NQ), Mackay Regional (MRF), and Central Queensland (CQ).  The South East Queensland Zone comprised 4 sub zones; Wide Bay (WB), Sunshine Coast (SC), South West Queensland (SWQ), and Gold Coast (GC).

The 4 semi finalists qualified for the FFA Cup, with 1 team coming from North Queensland, 1 coming from South East Queensland and 2 coming from Brisbane. The two finalists of Brisbane's Canale Cup qualified for both the FFA Cup and the FQ Cup Semi-finals.

Schedule

Qualifying round
A total of 32 Queensland teams took part in this stage of the competition. All matches in this round were completed by 22 February 2014.

Notes
 w/o = Walkover
 Byes – The Gap (5), Taringa Rovers (4), Western Spirit (5) and Ipswich City (5).

First round
A total of 72 Queensland teams took part in this stage of the competition. All matches in this round were completed by 13 March 2014.

This round saw the inclusion of teams from remaining Sub Zones FNQ, CQ, WB, SC, and SWQ; as well as more teams from NQ and MRF.

Notes
 † = After Extra Time
 Byes – Leichhardt (3), Nerimbera (3), Bingera (3), Moore Park (3), Nanango (3), and Gatton (3).

Second round
A total of 44 Queensland teams took part in this stage of the competition. All matches in this round were completed by 2 April 2014. New teams entering this round were Bayside United and Mitchelton.

Notes
 † = After Extra Time

Third round
A total of 34 Queensland teams took part in this stage of the competition. Twelve Brisbane Premier League teams (Tier 3) were admitted into the competition at this stage. This round also functions as the playoffs for each sub zone. All matches in this round were completed by 17 April 2014.

Notes
 † = After Extra Time

Fourth round
A total of 28 Queensland teams took part in this stage of the competition. Twelve Queensland National Premier League teams, plus Murwillumbah, were admitted into the competition at this stage.  All matches in this round were completed by 4 May 2014. Central Queensland Energy were removed from the NPL in March 2014 – and therefore from the qualifiers – after failing to meet licensing conditions.

Notes
 w/o = Walkover
 † = After Extra Time
 Byes – Mackay Magpies (3) and Gympie Diggers (4).

Fifth round
A total of 16 Queensland teams took part in this stage of the competition. All matches in this round were completed by 24 May 2014.

Quarter-finals
A total of 8 Queensland teams took part in this stage of the competition. The four victorious teams in this round qualified for the 2014 FFA Cup Round of 32. Matches in this round were played on 27 May–21 June 2014.

South Australia
South Australian clubs, other than Adelaide United in the A-League, may qualify for the FFA Cup via the 2014 Coca-Cola Federation Cup. One place from South Australia (the winner of the Final) will qualify for the 2014 FFA Cup.

Schedule

First round
A total of 26 South Australian teams took part in this stage of the competition. Matches in this round were played on 15 February–2 March 2014.

Notes
 † = After Extra Time
 Byes – Croydon Kings (2), MetroStars (2) and Western Toros (3).

Second round
A total of 16 South Australian teams took part in this stage of the competition. Matches in this round were played on 5 April 2014.

Notes
 † = After Extra Time

Quarter-finals
A total of 8 South Australian teams took part in this stage of the competition. Matches in this round were played on 21–30 April 2014.

Notes
 † = After Extra Time

Semi-finals
A total of 4 South Australian teams took part in this stage of the competition. Matches in this round were played on 7–14 May 2014.

Final
A total of 2 South Australian teams took part in this stage of the competition. The victorious team in this round qualified for the 2014 FFA Cup. The match in this round was played on 31 May 2014.

Tasmania
Tasmanian clubs qualify for the FFA Cup via the Milan Lakoseljac Cup. One place from Tasmania (the winner of the Final) will qualify for the 2014 FFA Cup.

Schedule

Qualifying round
A total of 7 Tasmanian teams took part in this stage of the competition. Byes to the Round of 16 were given to two clubs. Matches in this round were played on 10 March 2014.

Notes
 w/o = Walkover
 Bye – Burnie United.

First round
A total of 16 Tasmanian teams took part in this stage of the competition. Clubs from the T-League a conference of the National Premier Leagues and the top two clubs from the Northern Premier League and Southern Premier League in 2013 were admitted into the competition at this stage. Matches in this round were played on 15–23 March 2014.

Notes
 w/o = Walkover

Quarter-finals
A total of 8 Tasmanian teams took part in this stage of the competition. Matches in this round were played on 21 April 2014.

Notes
 † = After Extra Time

Semi-finals
A total of 4 Tasmanian teams took part in this stage of the competition. Matches in this round were played on 3–4 May 2014.

Final
A total of 2 Tasmanian teams took part in this stage of the competition. The victorious team in this round qualified for the 2014 FFA Cup Round of 32. This match was played on 9 June 2014.

Victoria
Victorian clubs, other than A-League clubs, will qualify for the final rounds of the FFA Cup via the 2014 Dockerty Cup (formerly known as the FFV State Knockout Cup). Other than the two A-League teams, four teams from Victoria (the semi-finalists) will qualify for the Round of 32.

Schedule

First round
A total of 70 teams took part in this stage of the competition, which was open to teams from the Victorian State League Division 5, regional, metros and masters leagues. Teams were seeded in terms of which round they would enter based on their Division in 2013. Tiers in the table refer to the current (2014) division, after a major reorganization of the Victorian competition structure. A total of 10 teams were given a Bye to the second round. Matches in this round were played on 1–4 March 2014.

Notes
 w/o = Walkover
 † = After Extra Time
 Byes – Brighton (7), Bundoora United (7), Chelsea (8), Harrisfield Hurricanes (8), Keilor Wolves (8), Kings Domain (8), Lara (8), Noble Park (7), Parkmore (8), White Star Dandenong (8).

Second round
A total of 112 teams took part in this stage of the competition. 72 Clubs from the clubs from the Victorian State League Division 4 and Division 3 entered into the competition at this stage. Teams were seeded in terms of which round they would enter based on their Division in 2013. Tiers in the table refer to the current (2014) division. Matches in this round were played on 7–9 March 2014.

Notes
 w/o = Walkover
 † = After Extra Time

Third round
A total of 80 teams took part in this stage of the competition. 24 Clubs from the Victorian State League Division 2 entered into the competition at this stage. Teams were seeded in terms of which round they would enter based on their Division in 2013. Tiers in the table refer to the current (2014) division. Matches in this round were played on 14–22 March 2014.

Notes
 w/o = Walkover
 † = After Extra Time

Fourth round
A total of 64 teams took part in this stage of the competition. 12 Clubs from the Victorian Premier League and 12 clubs from the Victorian State League Division 1 entered into the competition at this stage. Teams were seeded in terms of which round they would enter based on their Division in 2013. Tiers in the table refer to the current (2014) division. Matches in this round were played on 20 March–15 April 2014.

Notes
 † = After Extra Time

Fifth round
A total of 32 teams took part in this stage of the competition. Matches in this round were played on 17 April–14 May 2014.

Notes
 w/o = Walkover
 † = After Extra Time

Sixth round
A total of 16 teams took part in this stage of the competition. Matches in this round were played on 28 May–4 June 2014.

Notes
 † = After Extra Time

Quarter-finals
A total of 8 teams took part in this stage of the competition. The four victorious teams in this round qualified for the 2014 FFA Cup Round of 32 and to the Semi-finals of the 2014 Dockerty Cup. Matches in this round were played on 11–25 June 2014.

Notes
 † = After Extra Time

Western Australia
Western Australian clubs, other than Perth Glory in the A-League, qualify for the FFA Cup via the Football West State Cup, known this year for sponsorship reasons as the 2014 Cool Ridge Cup. Two places from WA (the semi-final winners) qualified for the FFA Cup 2014 Round of 32.

Schedule

Qualifying round
A total of 39 Western Australian teams took part in this stage of the competition. 24 clubs from the All Flags State League Division 1 and State League Division 2 and 15 clubs from various divisions of the 2014 Sunday League were admitted into the competition at this stage. Matches in this round were played on 29 March 2014.

Notes
 Byes – North Perth United (5), Swan United (3) and Fremantle United (4).

First round
A total of 32 teams took part in this stage of the competition. 11 of the 12 Clubs from the National Premier Leagues entered into the competition at this stage, with the exception of Perth Glory Youth who were not eligible. Matches in this round were played on 5 April 2014.

Second round
A total of 16 teams took part in this stage of the competition. Matches in this round were played on 21 April 2014.

Quarter-finals
A total of 8 teams took part in this stage of the competition. Matches in this round were played on 10 May 2014.

Notes
 † = After Extra Time

Semi-finals
A total of 4 teams took part in this stage of the competition. The two victorious teams in this round qualified for the 2014 FFA Cup Round of 32, and also for the Cool Ridge Cup Final. Matches in this round were played on 2 June 2014.

References

External links
 Official website

FFA Cup
2014 in Australian soccer
Australia Cup preliminary rounds